Philippe Pradayrol (16 June 1966 – 8 December 1993) was a French judoka. He competed in the men's extra-lightweight event at the 1992 Summer Olympics.

He died as result of a traffic accident in December 1993.

References

External links
 

1966 births
1993 deaths
Living people
French male judoka
Olympic judoka of France
Judoka at the 1992 Summer Olympics
Sportspeople from Avignon